Rock'n With Father Mike is a 7 inch Split EP released by Anti-Flag and The Bad Genes. It contains some of the oldest Anti-Flag recordings, as it was released in 1993 when they had newly formed the band. Possibly the rarest Anti-Flag record, it is highly sought after by fans today. The title is a reference to a punk rock preacher who was known as Father Mike. There are three known versions of the record. One has a pink cover, one has a light blue cover, and one has a yellow cover.

Track listing
Side A (Anti-Flag)
 "I Don't Want To Be Like You"
 "Fuck the Pope"

Side B (The Bad Genes)
"Salute"
"Chords That Cut"

1993 EPs
Anti-Flag albums